The Interpol 2 is a Norton motorcycle produced from 1984 to 1989. It has an air-cooled twin rotor  Wankel engine.

Its model name refers to the Norton Interpol, a 1970s police version of the Norton Commando. However, the Interpol was a piston-engined model and is mechanically unrelated to the Interpol 2.

Towards the end of the production run one machine was built for development purposes with a new water-cooled version of Norton's twin-rotor Wankel engine. This machine was designated Interpol 2A. When production of the Interpol 2 ceased it was succeeded by the P52 version of the Norton Commander.

Norton did not sell the Interpol 2 to the general public. Sales were restricted to fleet customers: civilian police forces, military police forces (particularly the Royal Air Force Police), and the RAC.

References

Interpol 2
Motorcycles powered by Wankel engines
Motorcycles introduced in 1984
Police vehicles